Calbuco Channel (Spanish: Canal de Calbuco) is a sea channel that separates Calbuco Island from the mainland of Chile. Due to its protected location the channel host a series of aquaculture cultivations.

Straits of Chile
Bodies of water of Los Lagos Region